The women's 100 metres event at the 2016 Summer Olympics took place between 12–13 August at the Olympic Stadium.

Summary
Shelly-Ann Fraser-Pryce was the defending Olympic champion from 2012 and entered the competition having won five of the last six global championships. At eighth in the year's rankings, she was not in peak form resulting from her toe injury. Elaine Thompson had beaten her at the Jamaican Championships with a world-leading and national record-equalling 10.70 seconds. American champion English Gardner was the next fastest and the two other American entrants, Tianna Bartoletta and Tori Bowie, shared third on the world rankings with African record breaker Murielle Ahouré at 10.78 seconds. Dutchwoman Dafne Schippers was also a strong entrant.

Charlotte Wingfield of Malta was comfortably the fastest qualifier in the preliminaries at 11.86 seconds. Cecilia Bouele of Congo was the only other athlete under 12 seconds in that round. In the first round proper Fraser-Pryce demonstrated her form with 10.96 seconds to top qualifying. Trinidad and Tobago's Michelle-Lee Ahye was the next fastest heat winner in eleven seconds dead, while all the top runners progressed. The semi-final round excised Murielle Ahoure and Tianna Bartoletta.  Earlier in the season, both had run 10.78 and are tied for the fourteenth-fastest in history. Fraser-Pryce and Thompson were the fastest in 10.88 but only eight hundredths separated the finalists.

In the final, Tori Bowie reacted the fastest, but Elaine Thompson got the best start. Shelly-Ann Fraser-Pryce has previously gained the edge from her exceptional start, but at best she was even with Thompson, which Thompson expanded upon for the win.  For her fast reaction, Bowie was a step behind in the early stages of the race but made a late rush to catch Fraser-Pryce just before the line for silver.  After an injured toe during most of the season, it was Fraser-Pryce's season best for bronze.		
Thompson's time 10.71 would have been good enough to be the fifth time in history, had she not already run 10.70 at the Jamaican Olympic Trials earlier in the season to tie Fraser-Pryce for fourth.

The medals were presented by Nawal El Moutawakel, IOC member, Morocco and Frankie Fredericks, Council Member of the IAAF.

Records
Prior to this competition, the existing world and Olympic records were as follows.

The following national records were established during the competition:

Schedule
All times are Brasilia Time (UTC-3)

Results

Preliminaries
The preliminary round of the competition featured athletes who had not achieved the required qualifying time for the event. Athletes who had achieved that time received a bye into the first round proper.

Qualification rule: first 2 of each heat (Q) plus the 2 fastest times (q) qualified.

Preliminary Heat 1

Preliminary Heat 2

Preliminary Heat 3

Heats
Qualification rule: first 2 of each heat (Q) plus the 8 fastest times (q) qualified.

Heat 1

Heat 2

Heat 3

Heat 4

Heat 5

Heat 6

Heat 7

Heat 8

Semifinals

Semifinal 1

Semifinal 2

Semifinal 3

Final

References
General

Specific

External links

women's 100 metres
2016
2016 in women's athletics
Women's events at the 2016 Summer Olympics